Domaniewek may refer to the following places in Poland:
Domaniewek, Łódź Voivodeship (central Poland)
Domaniewek, Masovian Voivodeship (east-central Poland)